San Baltazar Yatzachi el Bajo is a town and municipality in Oaxaca in south-western Mexico. The municipality covers an area of 48.48 km². This small town is located in the valley on the side of a mountain.  This mountain is connected to Yatzachi el Alto.
It is part of the Villa Alta District in the center of the Sierra Norte Region.

As of 2010, the municipality had a total population of about 50–80.

See also 
Yatzachi Zapotec

References

Municipalities of Oaxaca